Pietro Barucci (20 April 1845  – 23 February 1917) was an Italian painter, mainly of landscapes of rural areas around Rome.

Biography
Born in Rome, he studied at the Accademia di Belle Arti di Roma, where he was a pupil of professor Achille Vertunni. In 1878, he exhibited a landscape at the Accademia and was awarded a medal. He spent most of his career in Rome as a landscape painter; with occasional excursions to the Apennines.

Among his other works are paintings of the Campagna romana; Palude, and Castelfusano, at the exhibition of Belle Arti of Rome in 1883. He also had showings in Chicago in 1893, and at the Salon des Indépendants in Paris in 1907.

He was the grandfather of architect Pietro Barucci.

Works
Landscape  Hood Museum of Art, Dartmouth College, New Hampshire

References

External links

 More works by Barucci @ ArtNet
(IT) Evaluation parameters for Pietro Barucci's works, at ottocento.it

1849 births
1917 deaths
19th-century Italian painters
19th-century Italian male artists
Italian male painters
20th-century Italian painters
20th-century Italian male artists
Italian landscape painters
Painters from Rome